Osmond Imadiyi (born 4 November 1962) is a Nigerian boxer. He competed in the men's light heavyweight event at the 1988 Summer Olympics.

References

1962 births
Living people
Nigerian male boxers
Olympic boxers of Nigeria
Boxers at the 1988 Summer Olympics
Place of birth missing (living people)
Light-heavyweight boxers